The Seattle Department of Transportation (SDOT) is a municipal government agency in Seattle, Washington that is responsible for the maintenance of the city's transportation systems, including roads, bridges, and public transportation. The agency is funded primarily by taxes that are supplemented by voter-approved levies from other sources; its budget in 2017 was $450 million.

History

The Seattle Transportation Department was formed in 1996, as part of the re-organization and eventual dissolution of the Seattle Engineering Department. The division was renamed to the "Seattle Department of Transportation" in 2004.

Administration and management

Director

The department is managed by the Director of Transportation, a position appointed by the Mayor of Seattle and confirmed by a majority vote from the Seattle City Council. The position is subject to re-appointment and re-confirmation every four years.

Since 1997, nine people have held the office of Director of Transportation. Greg Spotts was nominated in 2022 for the position.

Funding

In 2015, SDOT had an adopted budget of $429 million. The largest portion of the budget, approximately $186 million, is allocated to major capital projects, including collaborations with regional and state agencies.

Transportation levies

Much of SDOT's long-term funding comes from voter-approved funding levies and other taxes. In 2006, the $365 million "Bridging the Gap" levy was approved by Seattle voters, using property taxes and parking fees to fund nine years of transportation improvements. The levy was replaced in 2015 by the voter-approved "Move Seattle" levy, funded by a new property tax, that will provide $930 million over a nine-year period.

Programs

Seattle Streetcar

SDOT maintains the citywide streetcar network, which consists of two lines, : the South Lake Union Streetcar, opened in 2007; and the First Hill Streetcar, opened in 2016.

Transit funding

In addition to road funding, SDOT also provides funding for public transit improvements through partner agencies. The 2015 "Move Seattle" levy includes funding for expansion of King County Metro's RapidRide system into Seattle, replacing existing bus routes.

Cycling infrastructure

Since the passage of "Bridging the Gap" levy in 2006, SDOT has funded $36 million in bicycle infrastructure, including  of bicycle lanes and sharrows,  of signed bicycle routes, and 2,230 bicycle parking spaces.

Facilities

, SDOT has an estimated $20 billion in transportation assets within the city of Seattle. It maintains  of streets, 122 bridges, 609 stairways, 158 traffic cameras, 1,061 signalized intersections, and 29,073 curb ramps.

References

External links

Government of Seattle
Transportation in Seattle
Transit agencies in Washington (state)
Government agencies established in 1996
1996 establishments in Washington (state)